The Statistics and Registration Service Act 2007 (c 18) is an Act of the Parliament of the United Kingdom which established the UK Statistics Authority (UKSA). It came into force in April 2008. Sir Michael Scholar was appointed as the first Chair of the UKSA.

The Act established the UK Statistics Authority as a non-ministerial department that employs the National Statistician. The National Statistician has an office to support them, the Office for National Statistics.

References

External links
 Guide to the Act from the Office for National Statistics

United Kingdom Acts of Parliament 2007
Office for National Statistics